Zé is a Portuguese form of the given name José. Notable people with the name include:

 Zé Arigó (1921–1971), Brazilian "psychic surgeon"
 Zé Castro (born 1983), Portuguese football player
 Zé Elias (born 1976), Brazilian football player
 Zé Kalanga (born 1983), Angolan football player
 Zé Ramalho (born 1949), Brazilian composer and performer
 Zé Roberto (born 1974), Brazilian football player
 Zé Sérgio (born 1957), Brazilian football player
 Zé (footballer, born 1991), Santomean football striker
 Zé Tó (born 1977), Portuguese football attacking midfielder

See also
 Zé Carlos, a short form of the name José Carlos
 Zé Eduardo, a short form of the name José Eduardo
 Zé Manel, a short form of the name José Manuel
 Zé Maria, a short form of the name José Maria
 Zé Roberto (disambiguation), a short form of the name José Roberto